Odditties (with two ts) is a compilation album by New Zealand group The Clean. It was initially self-released on cassette in 1983 by Cleano Productions, and re-released by Flying Nun Records, first as a double LP in 1985 and then on CD in 1994.

Track listing

1983 self-released cassette

Side A
Odditty
Success Story
Thumbs Off
Yellowman
Getting Older
End Of My Dream
Platypus
This Guy
David Bowie
Mudchucker Blues

Side B
At The Bottom
Hold Onto The Rail
Fats Domino
Sad Eyed Lady
Tell Me Why
In The Back
Band That Never Was
Wheels Of Industry
Point That Thing Dub
Safety At Home

1994 Flying Nun Records CD (fncd 223 / D19901)

Odditty - 02:38
Success Story - 03:15
Thumbs Off - 02:55
Getting Older - 04:34
Yellow Man - 04:01
End Of My Dream - 04:14
Platypus - 03:49
This Guy - 00:52
David Bowie - 01:51
Mudchucker Blues - 00:54
At The Bottom - 04:43
Hold Onto The Rail - 02:19
Inside Out - 03:33
Fats Domino - 02:04
Sad Eyed Lady - 03:03
Tell Me Why - 01:41
In The Back - 01:59
Band That Never Was - 02:22
Wheels Of Industry - 01:18
Point That Thing Dub - 03:52
Safety At Home - 01:50
Lemmings - 02:27
Stylaphone Music - 00:45

References

The Clean albums
Flying Nun Records albums
Rough Trade Records albums
1983 compilation albums